Christian Bekamenga (born 9 May 1986) is a Cameroonian professional footballer who plays as a forward at Real Potosi in Bolivian Primera División. In 2016, he made on appearance for the Cameroon national team.

Career
Bekamenga previously played for Negeri Sembilan FA of Malaysia. and Persib Bandung of Indonesia. He scored 17 goals in 19 appearances.

Because of his success at Persib Bandung, he was transferred to French club FC Nantes, this January. He helped the Olympic Lions to qualify for the 2008 Summer Olympics billed for Beijing, China.

During the summer 2015 transfer window Bekamenga moved to Troyes AC, however within a month the striker was reported to have moved again, to Turkish side Kardemir Karabükspor.

On the last day of the January transfermarket, Bekamenga was one of 22 players on two hours, that signed for Turkish club Elazığspor. had been placed under a transfer embargo but managed to negotiate it with the Turkish FA, leading to them going on a mad spree of signing and registering a load of players despite not even having a permanent manager in place. In just two hours, they managed to snap up a record 22 players - 12 coming in on permanent contracts and a further 10 joining on loan deals until the end of the season.

On 24 January 2020, Bekamenga was registered for Turkish-Cypriot club Gençlik Gücü in Nicosia, Cyprus. However, he only played one game for the club on 25 January 2020, before his registration was cancelled again. He was without club until 31 October 2020, where he joined Tonnerre Yaoundé in Cameroon on a short-term contract for the rest of the year.

Honors

International
Cameroon U23
African Games: 2007

References

External links
 
 
 All Time Persib Players at www.persibhistory.com
 
 Christian Bekamenga at TFF

1986 births
Living people
Cameroonian footballers
Cameroon international footballers
Footballers at the 2008 Summer Olympics
Olympic footballers of Cameroon
Association football forwards
Liga 1 (Indonesia) players
Ligue 1 players
Ligue 2 players
Championnat National players
TFF First League players
Chinese Super League players
Persib Bandung players
Negeri Sembilan FA players
FC Nantes players
US Orléans players
USJA Carquefou players
Stade Lavallois players
ES Troyes AC players
Liaoning F.C. players
Balıkesirspor footballers
Büyükşehir Belediye Erzurumspor footballers
Elazığspor footballers
Tonnerre Yaoundé players
Cameroonian expatriate footballers
Expatriate footballers in Malaysia
Expatriate footballers in Indonesia
Expatriate footballers in France
Expatriate footballers in China
Expatriate footballers in Cyprus
Cameroonian expatriate sportspeople in Indonesia
Cameroonian expatriate sportspeople in Malaysia
Cameroonian expatriate sportspeople in France
Cameroonian expatriate sportspeople in Turkey
Cameroonian expatriate sportspeople in China